Christmas at Water's Edge is a contemporary variation of A Christmas Carol, directed by Lee Davis, starring Keshia Knight Pulliam, Tom Bosley and Pooch Hall. It was shown in theaters in 2004 and released on DVD in 2007.

The film is about a wealthy collegian (Keshia Knight Pulliam) and an angel-in-training (Pooch Hall) who work together to organize a holiday concert for a youth center.

Plot
An angel from above walks into Layla Turner's (Knight-Pulliam) life and shows her the true meaning of the holiday season. The angel's mission is to transform Layla's materialistic views about the occasion. The angel opened Layla's eyes, showing that there is more to Christmas than things money can buy.

See also
 List of films about angels
 List of Christmas films

References

External links

2004 television films
2004 films
2000s Christmas drama films
American Christmas drama films
Christmas television films
2000s English-language films
2000s American films